Zur-Bulyak (Źur Büläk) is a rural locality (a village) in Tanovsky Selsoviet, Blagovarsky District, Bashkortostan, Russia. The population was 82 as of 2010. There is 1 street.

Geography 
Zur-Bulyak is located 20 km south of Yazykovo (the district's administrative centre) by road. Tan is the nearest rural locality.

References 

Rural localities in Blagovarsky District